Korzenna  is a village in southern Poland situated in Lesser Poland Voivodeship since 1999 (it was previously in Nowy Sącz Voivodeship from 1975-1998).

References

Villages in Nowy Sącz County